

This is a list of the National Register of Historic Places listings in Pima County, Arizona.

This is intended to be a complete list of the properties and districts on the National Register of Historic Places in Pima County, Arizona, United States. The locations of National Register properties and districts for which the latitude and longitude coordinates are included below, may be seen in a map.

There are 203 properties and districts listed on the National Register in the county, including 4 that are also National Historic Landmarks.  Three properties formerly listed have been removed from the National Register.

Current listings

|}

Former listings

|}

See also

 List of National Historic Landmarks in Arizona
 National Register of Historic Places listings in Arizona

References

 
Pima